Elga Andersen (née Helga Hymen or Hymmen) (2 February 1935 – 7 December 1994) was a German actress and singer. She starred in more than one dozen French films in the 1950s and 1960s and also debuted as a recording artist in the 1950s. She performed the songs "" and "" in the 1961 film The Guns of Navarone, and co-starred in the 1971 Steve McQueen film Le Mans. Together with her second husband, Peter Gimbel, she embarked on a 1981 diving expedition of the sunken .

Early life
She was born Helga Hymen (or Hymmen) in Dortmund, Germany. She was the only child of her parents; her father was a civil engineer. Her father enlisted with the Wehrmacht two weeks before World War II ended and was dispatched to the Russian front; he was never heard from again. Hymen dropped out of high school at age 16 and worked as an English and French interpreter to help support her and her mother. When she was 18 she moved to Paris and worked as a model.

Film career
She made her acting debut in Les Collegiennes, a 1957 French film directed by André Hunebelle, under the name Elga Hymen.

Otto Preminger selected her for a small role in his film Bonjour Tristesse in 1958 and gave her the stage name "Elga Andersen". Her first starring role was in 1960 in Brazilian Rhapsody. Into the 1970s she appeared in many predominantly European productions. Her American productions included A Global Affair (1964), starring Bob Hope, and Le Mans (1971), in which she played opposite Steve McQueen. Andersen and McQueen reportedly had an affair during the filming. One of the Porsche 911S sports coupes used in the production was given to Andersen as partial compensation for her work in the film.

Personal life
Her first husband was Christian Girard, a Parisian architect. In 1978 she remarried to the American millionaire Peter R. Gimbel.

Andersen said that their main objective was to determine why the ship sank so quickly after being struck by an ocean liner near Nantucket, Massachusetts, on 25 July 1956. At the same time, the salvage crew searched for shipboard vaults that they believed contained thousands of dollars in cash and currency. At the beginning of September 1981, after salvaging one of the vaults, the expedition members decided to end the project. The couple produced two documentaries for American television about their expedition.

Andersen died of cancer on 7 December 1994. In 1995 her ashes and those of Gimbel, who had died in 1987, were interred in the Andrea Doria during a diving expedition.

Partial filmography

1957: Les Collégiennes – Hélène
1957: Love in the Afternoon – Bit Part (uncredited)
1957: La polka des menottes – Une infirmière (uncredited)
1957: Girl Merchants
1958: Bonjour Tristesse – Denise
1958: Ascenseur pour l'échafaud – Frieda Bencker
1958: Solang' die Sterne glüh'n – Doris Hoff, Fotografin
1958: Ist Mama nicht fabelhaft? – Evelyn
1958: So ein Millionär hat's schwer – Alice Sorel
1960: I baccanali di Tiberio
1960: Os Bandeirantes – Elga
1961: Le monocle noir – Martha
1961: Mourir d'amour – Karin, la secrétaire
1962: Le scorpion – Corinne
1962: The Eye of the Monocle – Erika Murger
1962: L'empire de la nuit – Widow
1963: Your Turn, Darling – Valérie Pontiac / Montana
1964: A Global Affair – Yvette
1964: Coffin from Hong Kong – Stella
1965:  – Inge Moebius
1965: Coast of Skeletons – Elizabeth Von Koltze
1966:  – Sonia
1966: Star Black – Caroline Williams
1968: Captain Singrid – Singrid
1968: Run, Psycho, Run – Claire/ Ann
1968: Più tardi Claire, più tardi... – Claire / Ann
1970: Sex-Power – Lorelei
1971: Le Mans – Lisa Belgetti
1971: Un omicidio perfetto a termine di legge – Monica Breda
1971: Detenuto in attesa di giudizio – Ingrid Di Noi
1971–1974: Aux frontières du possible (French TV show) – Barbara Andersen (final appearance)
1973: Night Flight from Moscow – Kate Cross

References

External links
 
 

1935 births
1994 deaths
Musicians from Dortmund
People from the Province of Westphalia
German film actresses
German television actresses
20th-century German actresses
20th-century German women singers
Gimbel family
Actors from Dortmund
Deaths from cancer in New York (state)